Woodward is a city in Dallas County, Iowa, United States. The population was 1,346 at the time of the 2020 census. It is part of the Des Moines–West Des Moines Metropolitan Statistical Area. Woodward is also home to the Woodward-Granger Community School District's middle school and high school, the elementary school being located in Granger.

History
"The town of Woodward was born when the Chicago, Milwaukee, and St. Paul Railway Co reconstructed its lines through the community the depot was constructed.  The original name for the town was decided upon as Colton, another town had already adopted the name so the name was changed to Woodward.  The City was incorporated in August 1883.  The first Council meeting was on December 18, 1883 called to order by Mayor W.S. Craft."

An F-2 tornado struck Woodward, the city of Ames, and several other small Iowan communities on November 12, 2005, devastating many homes in the southeast and east parts of town. There were no deaths in Woodward, although there was one in Stratford. Discovery Channel's series Destroyed In Seconds showed the natural disaster in one of its episodes. During the first season of Dirty Jobs they visited a pig farmer from Woodward in the episode.

Geography

Woodward is located at  (41.855230, -93.923068).

Demographics

2010 census
As of the census of 2010, there were 1,024 people, 455 households, and 274 families residing in the city. The racial makeup of the city was 95.3% White, 1.1% African American, 0.6% Native American, 0.9% Asian, 0.1% from other races, and 2.1% from two or more races. Hispanic or Latino of any race were 2.2% of the population.

There were 455 households, of which 28.4% had children under the age of 18 living with them, 45.3% were married couples living together, 9.2% had a female householder with no husband present, 5.7% had a male householder with no wife present, and 39.8% were non-families. 34.3% of all households were made up of individuals, and 12.1% had someone living alone who was 65 years of age or older. The average household size was 2.25 and the average family size was 2.86.

The median age in the city was 40.4 years. 22.8% of residents were under the age of 18; 8.1% were between the ages of 18 and 24; 24.9% were from 25 to 44; 31.2% were from 45 to 64; and 13.1% were 65 years of age or older. The gender makeup of the city was 47.4% male and 52.6% female.

2000 census
As of the census of 2000, there were 1,200 people, 490 households, and 309 families residing in the city. The racial makeup of the city was 97.33% White, 0.08% African American, 0.33% Native American, 0.83% Asian, 1.00% from other races, and 0.42% from two or more races. Hispanic or Latino of any race were 1.17% of the population.

There were 490 households, out of which 34.9% had children under the age of 18 living with them, 47.8% were married couples living together, 11.4% had a female householder with no husband present, and 36.9% were non-families. 32.2% of all households were made up of individuals, and 14.3% had someone living alone who was 65 years of age or older. The average household size was 2.39 and the average family size was 3.06.

In the city, the population was spread out, with 28.3% under the age of 18, 7.2% from 18 to 24, 29.3% from 25 to 44, 21.8% from 45 to 64, and 13.3% who were 65 years of age or older. The median age was 37 years. For every 100 females, there were 83.8 males. For every 100 females age 18 and over, there were 82.6 males.

The median income for a household in the city was $35,647, and the median income for a family was $43,333. Males had a median income of $29,500 versus $23,625 for females. The per capita income for the city was $19,501. About 4.7% of families and 6.9% of the population were below the poverty line, including 9.3% of those under age 18 and 11.5% of those age 65 or over.

Government
Mr. Brian Devick has served as Mayor since 2011.  the city council members are Ashvin Patel, Jesse A. Purvis, Richard Hartwig, Paul Thompson and Craig DeHoet.

Public safety
Woodward is served by a volunteer fire department, which has served since 1883.

Education
The Woodward-Granger Community School District operates local public schools.

Nearby organizations 
 Camp Mitigwa, which serves the Boy Scouts of America Mid Iowa Council, lies north of Woodward.
 Woodward State Resource Center is located in Woodward.
 Woodward Academy, located in Woodward, is a boot camp for teenage boys who have been convicted of various crimes.
–There is also the Picket Fence Creamery, located right outside of Woodward. They are well known for their 100% natural dairy products and their unusual flavors, such as orange milk. While also selling some meat, they are most widely known for their ice cream, which is sold in Woodward and around central Iowa.

See also

High Trestle Trail

References

External links

City website
City-Data Comprehensive Statistical Data and more about Woodward

Cities in Dallas County, Iowa
Cities in Iowa
Des Moines metropolitan area
1883 establishments in Iowa